The Jiugong Mountains are a range of mountains located in southern Hubei, China.

Description
The name of the range means 'Mountains of the Nine temples'.
Geographically the Jiugong range is a subrange of the Luoxiao Mountains with ridges roughly oriented in a southwest/northeast direction. The Jiugong Range with the Jiugong Mountain National Park is the best-known tourist attraction in Tongshan County, Hubei.

Features

References

External links

Hubei Jiugong Mountain 湖北九宫山风光

Mountain ranges of Hubei